Patricia Combs Fawsett (born August 21, 1943) is a senior United States district judge of the United States District Court for the Middle District of Florida.

Education and career

Fawsett was born in 1943 in Montreal, Canada. She received her Bachelor of Arts degree from the University of Florida in 1965, her Master of Arts in Teaching from the University of Florida in 1966, and her Juris Doctor from the University of Florida College of Law in 1973. Fawsett was in private practice in Orlando, Florida from 1973 to 1986.

Federal judicial service

President Ronald Reagan nominated Fawsett to the United States District Court for the Middle District of Florida on April 9, 1986, to the seat vacated by Judge John A. Reed Jr. Confirmed by the Senate on June 6, 1986, she received her commission three days later. She served as Chief Judge of the court from 2003 to 2008. She took senior status on August 25, 2008.

Notable cases 
Fawsett sentenced  Keith Pound to 740 years in prison and Sholam Weiss to 845 years in prison after the two men were found guilty of multiple counts of financial crime, money-laundering, and a fraud scheme against National Heritage Life Insurance. She also sentenced Erin Sharma, a federal corrections officer who deliberately arranged to move an alleged inmate informant into the cell of a notoriously violent inmate, resulting in his fatal beating, to life in prison.

References

External links
 

1943 births
Living people
University of Florida alumni
Judges of the United States District Court for the Middle District of Florida
United States district court judges appointed by Ronald Reagan
20th-century American judges
Fredric G. Levin College of Law alumni
21st-century American judges
20th-century American women judges
21st-century American women judges